Kirki railway station is a railway station in Alexandroupoli in Eastern Macedonia and Thrace, Greece. The station buildings are intact, but disused. The station stands 0.5 km (0.3 mi) from the village centre located within the village of Kirki, (part of Alexandroupoli). The journey from Kirki to Alexandroupli takes around 30 mins.

Facilities
The station is still housed in the original 19th-century brick-built station building; however, the buildings are rundown and abandoned. As of (2020) the station is unstaffed, with no staffed booking office or waiting rooms. There is no footbridge over the lines, though passengers can walk across the rails, it is, however, not wheelchair accessible. The station has no toilet facilities; as a result, the station is currently little more than an unstaffed halt.

Services
The station is served by around one train per day, to/from Alexandroupoli and Thessaloniki.

References

External links
 Kirki Station - National Railway Network Greek Travel Pages

Railway stations in Eastern Macedonia and Thrace
Buildings and structures in Evros (regional unit)
Alexandroupolis